Gomez-Perez v. Potter, 553 U.S. 474 (2008), is a labor law case of the United States Supreme Court holding that federal employees can assert claims for retaliation resulting from filing an age discrimination complaint. The case continued the Court's long-standing position that cause for action following retaliation can be inferred in civil rights legislation, even though the law does not explicitly provide protection against victimization.

The case is important because it signaled a willingness by recently appointed Justice Samuel Alito to continue the Court's expansive interpretation of civil rights laws.

Background
Myrna Gómez-Pérez worked for the United States Postal Service as a part-time window distribution clerk in Puerto Rico. Ms. Gómez-Pérez sought a transfer to a full-time position; however, her supervisor denied her request.  Ms. Gómez-Pérez alleged that the supervisor denied the request based on her age and filed an EEO complaint on the basis of age discrimination. Subsequently, Ms. Gómez-Pérez alleged that, as a result of filing her complaint, in retaliation she was subjected to a series of reprisals that included groundless charges of sexual harassment, substantial reductions in her hours, and being harassed and mocked by her co-workers. As a result, she filed a retaliation complaint.

Opinion of the Court
The Supreme Court held that federal employees can assert claims for retaliation resulting from filing an age discrimination complaint.

Even though it is not explicitly in the Civil Rights Act, the existence of the right can be inferred from the Act's scheme, as necessary to make the rights effective.

See also
US labor law
List of United States Supreme Court cases, volume 553

External links
 

 Supreme Court Oral Argument Transcript
 New York Times editorial on the ruling
  AARP: Supreme Court Agrees that Older Federal Workers are Protected from Retaliation

United States Supreme Court cases
United States Supreme Court cases of the Roberts Court
United States labor case law
2008 in United States case law